Earl L. Vandermeulen High School, also referred to as Port Jefferson High School, is in the Port Jefferson School District, located in Port Jefferson, New York.

History and overview 
The current school building was originally built by the Public Works Administration.
Port Jefferson High School was renamed around 1960 in honor of Earl L.
Vandermeulen, who served as principal from 1923 to 1960.  

As of 2014, the current student body size (9th - 12th grade) is close
to 400 students.

In the past, the school served a larger student population, including
students from a number of other communities that did not have their
own high schools.  In 1933, for example, the school was
also accepting students from Port
Jefferson Station, Terryville,
Belle Terre, Miller
Place, Mount Sinai,
Rocky Point, Wading
River, Shoreham,
Middle Island, West Middle Island, West
Yaphank, Ridge, Coram,
Selden, and Stony Brook.   As surrounding communities began to
open their own high schools with the spread of suburban growth into
Suffolk County, this practice subsided,
and finally ended with the opening of Mount
Sinai High School in 1991. The last graduating class outside Port Jefferson from Mount Sinai graduated in June 1992.

Academics 
In 2008, the school was placed 127th on Newsweek Magazine's 1,300 top U.S. high schools list, which placed it first among school ranked in Suffolk County and 20th among schools ranked in New York.  According to 2007 data, 98.9% of school graduates earn a New York State Regent's diploma, 78.2 percent of graduates plan to attend 4 year college, and 19.5% plan to attend a 2-year college.

Athletics  
Earl L. Vandermeulen fields a number of varsity and junior varsity athletic teams in Section 11 (League 8) of the New York State Public High School Athletic Association, including the following sports:

Fall
Football (Boys)
Soccer (Boys and Girls)
Volleyball (Girls)
Gymnastics (Girls)
Cross Country (Boys and Girls)
Field Hockey (Girls)
Golf (Coed)
Cheerleading (Girls)
Tennis (Girls)

Winter
Basketball (Boys and Girls)
Winter Track (Boys and Girls)
Wrestling (Boys)
Cheerleading (Girls)

Spring
Baseball (Boys)
Softball (Girls)
Track (Boys and Girls)
Lacrosse (Boys and Girls)
Tennis (Boys)

Notable alumni
 Les Goodman, former running back in the National Football League
 Toby Knight, former American professional basketball player, played professionally for the New York Knicks.
 Chris Colmer, American football offensive lineman in the National Football League
 Martin Tankleff, wrongfully convicted in the 1988 murder of his parents.  Sentenced to 50 years-to-life, verdict vacated and released in 2007.
 Maurice DuBois, television anchorman.
 Ed McMullen, U.S. ambassador to Switzerland and Liechtenstein.
William Polchinski, a.k.a. "Broadway Blotto," guitarist and vocalist for the rock band Blotto.
 James F. Burke (musician) World renowned cornet soloist

References

External links
 http://www.portjeffschools.org/
 https://web.archive.org/web/20100426122248/http://portjefferson.com/

Public high schools in New York (state)
Brookhaven, New York
Civilian Conservation Corps in New York (state)
Schools in Suffolk County, New York